Flete is a hamlet 3 km southwest of Margate in Kent, United Kingdom. It is in the Thanet local government district. At the 2011 census the population of the hamlet was included in the civil parish of Manston.

Villages in Kent